The Irving G. Thalberg Memorial Award is awarded periodically by the Academy of Motion Picture Arts and Sciences at the Governors Awards ceremonies to "creative producers, whose bodies of work reflect a consistently high quality of motion picture production". The award is named for Irving Thalberg, head of the Production Division of Metro-Goldwyn-Mayer, who developed the company's reputation for sophisticated films. The trophy itself is a bust of Thalberg rather than the familiar "Oscar" statuette. However, it is still counted as an "honorary Oscar". The award was established in 1937 and was first presented at the 10th Academy Awards, in March 1938. Since 2009, it has been presented at the separate Governors Awards rather than at the regular Academy Awards ceremony. There have been 39 Thalberg Memorial Awards given to date.

Katharine Hepburn made her first and only appearance at the ceremony to present the Irving G. Thalberg Memorial Award to her long-time friend Lawrence Weingarten at the 46th Academy Awards ceremony in 1974.

List of recipients

Other nominees
Other nominees for the 11th Academy Awards (the only year for which non-winning nominations were announced):
 Samuel Goldwyn
 Joe Pasternak
 David O. Selznick
 Hunt Stromberg
 Walter Wanger
 Darryl F. Zanuck

See also
:Category:Recipients of the Irving G. Thalberg Memorial Award

External links

1937 establishments in California
Thalberg Memorial Award
Awards established in 1937
Lifetime achievement awards
Academy Awards